James Moffatt (4 July 1870, Glasgow – 27 June 1944, New York City) was a Scottish theologian and graduate of the University of Glasgow.

Moffatt trained at the Free Church College, Glasgow, and was a practising minister at the United Free Church in Dundonald in the early years of his career. He received the degree Doctor of Divinity from the University of St Andrews in April 1902.

In 1911, he was appointed Professor of Greek and New Testament Exegesis at Mansfield College, Oxford, but he returned to Glasgow in 1915 as Professor of Church History at the United Free Church College. From 1927 to 1939, he was Washburn Professor of Church History at the Union Theological Seminary, New York. In addition, he translated a Modern English Bible translation, the Moffatt, New Translation (MNT).

Translation of Bible

His New Translation of the New Testament was first published in 1913. His New Translation of the Old Testament, in two volumes, was first published in 1924. The Complete Moffatt Bible in one volume was first published in 1926. It was completely revised and reset in 1935. A Shorter Version of the Moffatt Translation of the Bible was first published in 1941.

The Moffatt New Testament Commentary, based on his translation, has 17 volumes. The first volume was published in 1928, the final volume in 1949. The concordance of the complete Bible was first published in 1949.

Works

 The Historical New Testament: Being the Literature of the New Testament Arranged in the Order of its Literary Growth and According to the Dates of the Documents, 1901
 The Golden Book of John Owen: Passages from the Writings of the Rev. John Owen, 1904
 Literary Illustrations of the Bible: The Book of Ecclesiastes, 1905
 Literary Illustrations of the Bible: The Gospel of Saint Mark, 1905
 Literary Illustrations of the Bible: The Epistle to the Romans, 1905
 Literary Illustrations of the Bible: The Book of Revelation, 1905
 Literary Illustrations of the Bible: The Gospel of Saint Luke, 1906
 Literary Illustrations of the Bible: The Books of Judges and Ruth, 1906
 The Literal Interpretation of the Sermon on the Mount, (with Marcus Dods and James Denney) 1904 (Re-published 2016, CrossReach Publications)
 The Mission and Expansion of Christianity in the First Three Centuries, v. 1–3 by Adolf Harnack. Translated by James Moffatt (1908)
 Paul and Jesus, 1908
 George Meredith: Introduction to His Novels, 1909
 The Life of John Owen, 1910?
 Paul and Paulinism, 1910
 The Second Things of Life, 1910
 The Expositor’s Dictionary of Texts, vol. 1: Genesis to the Gospel of St. Mark, 1910
 The Expositor’s Dictionary of Texts, vol. 2: The Gospel of St. Luke to Revelation, 1911
 Reasons and reasons, 1911
 An Introduction to the Literature of the New Testament, 1911
 The Theology of the Gospels, 1912
 The Expositor's Dictionary of Poetical Quotations, 1913
 The Moffatt Translation of the New Testament, 1913
 A Book of Biblical Devotions for Members of the Scottish Church, 1919
 The Approach to the New Testament, 1921
 The Spiritual Pilgrimage of Jesus, (with James Alex Robertson) 1921 
 Jesus on Love to God, Jesus on Love to Man, 1922
 The Moffatt Translation of the Old Testament, 1924
 The Bible in Scots Literature, 1924
 The Tree of Healing. Short Studies in the Message of the Cross, (With a biographical sketch by James Moffatt) 1925
 The Presbyterian Churches, 1928
 Love in the New Testament, 1929
 The Moffatt New Testament Commentary on the Bible V.1, 1929
 The Day Before Yesterday, 1930
 Grace in the New Testament, 1932
 He and She: A Book of Them, 1933
 His Gifts & Promises: Being Twenty-Five Reflections and Directions on Phases of our Christian Discipline, From the Inside., 1934
 Handbook to the Church Hymnary, with Supplement, (with Millar Patrick) 1935
 The Ideas Behind the Moffatt Bible: Compiled from the Introduction to the Moffatt Bible, 1935
 The Second Book of He and She: Another Book of Them, 1935
 An Approach to Ignatius, 1936
 The First Five Centuries of the Church, 1938
 Jesus Christ the Same; The Shaffer Lectures for 1940 in the Divinity School of Yale University, 1940
 The Thrill of Tradition, 1944
 Concordance of The Moffatt Translation of the Bible, 1949

References

External links

 
 
 Papers of James Moffatt at Glasgow University
 The Historical New Testament

1870 births
1944 deaths
Translators of the Bible into English
Fellows of Mansfield College, Oxford
Scottish Christian theologians
Alumni of the University of Glasgow
Union Theological Seminary (New York City) faculty